"Girl I've Been Hurt" is a song by Canadian reggae musician Snow, released as the second single from his debut album, 12 Inches of Snow. Following the wildly successful single "Informer," "Girl I've Been Hurt" peaked at number 19 on the US Billboard Hot 100, and charted internationally as well.

Music and lyrics
While "Informer" documented a false murder charge and prison life, "Girl I’ve Been Hurt" presented a more sensitive theme, revolving around a breakup between a man and a woman in a relationship. The protagonist discovers that his "girl" has been cheating on him and he promptly dumps her and professes his desire to "find another lover." Whereas Jamaican patois-inspired lyrics conveyed the meaning of "Informer," "Girl I've Been Hurt" mixed Snow's sensitive crooning with a short reggae bridge.

Critical reception
Larry Flick from Billboard wrote, "The pop/hip-hop community's latest star follows his platinum-selling smash, "Informer", with a languid ditty that will solidify his presence at several radio formats. A slick beat-base is firm support for a catchy, sing-along chorus and occasional toasting." A reviewer from Music & Media said, "Just for your information, sometimes it snows in May. The white ragga man now tries his luck with a ballad and the snowball effect will continue on EHR and dance radio." Alan Jones from Music Week gave it four out of five, calling it "both powerful and different." He added, "The smooth, loping bass mix by Sly & Robbie is exemplary and makes for a more subtle song."

Music video
The original music video for the song features Snow pursuing scantily clad women in an isolated, winter terrain. By the end of the video, at an outdoor party that includes a snowball fight, Snow hooks up with "another lover." The video featured much of Snow's early entourage, including his former DJ Marvin Prince, David Eng and the late EZ Steve Salem. In addition, a second "boggle" remix video of "Girl I’ve Been Hurt" appeared and featured the "Snow girls" audition.

Live performances
While performing at Sunsplash '93, Ninjaman asked Snow to sing "Girl I've Been Hurt," saying: "Come up and sing 'Girl I've Been Hurt' because I like that song. If you sing that and the audience doesn't go crazy, I'll shoot everyone in the crowd!"

As Reggae Report observed, "fortunately, the crowd went wild for his performance and Ninja never had to make good on his threats!"

Track listings

CD maxi
 "Girl, I've Been Hurt" (edit) — 4:01
 "Girl, I've Been Hurt" (remix) — 3:57
 "Girl, I've Been Hurt" (Dunbar remix by Sly & Robbie) — 4:00
 "Girl, I've Been Hurt" (Warm edit) — 4:58

7-inch single
 "Girl I've Been Hurt" (radio edit) — 4:01
 "Informer" — 4:28

12-inch maxi
 "Girl, I've Been Hurt" (Dunbar remix by Sly & Robbie) — 4:00
 "Girl, I've Been Hurt" (Warm edit) — 5:48
 "Girl, I've Been Hurt" (Dunbar instrumental) - 4:01

Personnel
 Writers: Darrin O'Brien, Edmund Leary, Shawn Moltke
 Producer: MC Shan
 Executive producer: David Eng, EZ Steve Salem
 Co-producers: Edmund Leary, John "Jumpstreet" Ficarotta

Charts

References

External links
 Girl I've Been Hurt on YouTube

1993 songs
1993 singles
East West Records singles
Snow (musician) songs
Songs about infidelity
Songs written by Snow (musician)